Scott Cohen (born 1965) is the co-founder of digital distribution company The Orchard, which was founded on the Lower East Side of Manhattan in 1997 and is now owned by Sony Music. The Orchard was the first digital distributor of music.

In February 2019, Cohen retired from The Orchard and joined the senior management team at Warner Music Group. His role is the Chief Innovation Officer.   

He sat on the British Phonographic Industry Council, and was the chairman of the board of music agency Sound Diplomacy.

Cohen's music career started in the late 1980s in independent and major label artist management. In 1997, he and Richard Gottehrer (the co-founder of Sire Records) founded The Orchard.

In 2016 Cohen was one of the founders of Cyborg Nest, a company that aimed to create extra senses in order to enhance human perception.  

In January 2019, at Eurosonic Noorderslag, Cohen discussed the future of the music industry during a keynote presentation. He explored Blockchain, and the rise in virtual reality and artificial intelligence in music.

References 

http://www.dailyrindblog.com/?p=910
http://www.music4point5.com/blog/tag/scott-cohen/
http://musically.com/blog/2008/11/19/video-qa-with-the-orchard-founder-scott-cohen/
http://business.transworld.net/76242/features/76242/
http://digitalderry.org/big-thinking/scott-cohen-from-the-orchard-talks-about-making-music-pay/
http://www.billboard.biz/bbbiz/industry/digital-and-mobile/orchard-ioda-merging-sony-music-to-invest-1006370152.story
http://www.completemusicupdate.com/article/new-music-export-consultancy-sound-diplomacy-launches/
https://www.theguardian.com/technology/2017/jan/06/first-humans-sense-where-north-is-cyborg-gadget

External links 
http://www.theorchard.com/
http://www.londonmet.ac.uk/
http://www.bpi.co.uk/

Living people
1965 births